Running Fitness is a globally circulated monthly magazine for recreational runners, published by Kelsey Media in Peterborough, in the United Kingdom.

History
It was established in 1985. EMAP sold the title to Kelsey Media in 2006. The headquarters of the magazine later moved to Kent. 

In addition to the printed magazine, the magazine's web sites have provided a valuable resource for runners, including thorough running race event calendars.

References

External links
Official Website
Treadmill Express Plus
Body Capable Homepage

Athletics magazines
Fitness magazines
Running mass media
Mass media in Kent
Mass media in Peterborough
Magazines established in 1985
Monthly magazines published in the United Kingdom
Sports magazines published in the United Kingdom